Megachile luctifera is a species of bee in the family Megachilidae. It was described by Spinola in 1841.

References

Luctifera
Insects described in 1841